is a Japanese anime director credited for work with Ufotable on The Garden of Sinners: Paradox Spiral, Gyo, Majocco Shimai no Yoyo to Nene, and God Eater.

Filmography

Anime

Films

References

External links
 
 Takayuki Hirao anime at Media Arts Database 

1979 births
Anime directors
Living people